Troyus turneri, or Turner's skipper, is a butterfly found in Jamaica.

The wingspan is about 10 mm.

References

Hesperiidae
Butterflies of Jamaica
Endemic fauna of Jamaica